Heresy is any belief or theory that is strongly at variance with established beliefs or customs.

Heresy may also refer to:

Music
 Heresy (band), a 1980s UK hardcore punk band

Albums
 Heresy (Lustmord album), 1990
 Heresy (Paradox album), 1989

Songs
 "Heresy" (Rush song), 1991
 "Heresy", a song by Nine Inch Nails from The Downward Spiral
 "Heresy", a song by Pantera from Cowboys from Hell

Other uses
 Heresy (radio series), a UK comedy talk show
 Heresy: Kingdom Come, a collectible card game
 The Heresies Collective, an American feminist collective  
 Heresies: A Feminist Publication on Art and Politics, a second wave feminist publication (1977–1993) edited by the Heresies Collective
 Heresy, a 2001 novel in the Aquasilva Trilogy by Anselm Audley

See also
 Hearsay (disambiguation)
 Heretic (disambiguation)